Gladys Jayawardene (19??-September 12, 1989) was a Sri Lankan Physician and academic. She was the first female Director of the Medical Research Institute and Chairman of the State Pharmaceutical Corporation. She was assassinated by the Janatha Vimukthi Peramuna (JVP) for importing Indian medicines.

Educated at C.M.S. Ladies' College, Colombo, she graduated from the Colombo Medical College and gained a PhD in Parasitology from the University of London as the first Sri Lankan female to do so.

Joining the Ceylon Medical Service after graduation she transferred to the Medical Research Institute and went on to become its first female Director in the 1980s and in 1988 was appointed Chairman of the State Pharmaceutical Corporation (SPC). During her tenure the SPC began manufacturing Oral Rehydration Salts “Jeevanee” based on a formula approved by the WHO and UNICEF which had been imported before.
With the onset of the 1987–89 JVP Insurrection, Dr Jayawardene was threatened by the JVP to stop imports of medicines from India due to their Anti-Indian policy. She refused to be intimidated and was assassinated by the JVP on September 12, 1989 suspected JVP gunmen at Slave Island, Colombo.

She married Dr Roland "Roly" Jayawardene, a medical doctor and brother of J. R. Jayewardene. She was the President of the Ladies’ College Old Girls’ Association from 1973 - 1974. The Gladys Jayawardene Gold Medal for Parasitology is awarded annually by the Faculty of Medicine, University of Colombo.

See also
 List of people assassinated by the Janatha Vimukthi Peramuna
 1987–89 JVP Insurrection
 Stanley Wijesundera

References

Year of birth missing
1989 deaths
Sinhalese academics
Sinhalese physicians
Alumni of the University of Ceylon (Colombo)
Alumni of the University of London
Alumni of Ladies' College, Colombo
Assassinated Sri Lankan people
Deaths by car bomb in Sri Lanka
Sri Lankan women academics
Sri Lankan academic administrators
Women physicians
20th-century women scientists